A bread bowl is a round loaf of bread which has had the top cut off and a large portion of the middle hollowed out to create an edible bowl. They are typically larger than a roll but smaller than a full sized loaf of bread. 

Bread bowls can be used to serve chili, New England-style clam chowder, and other thick stews (often, but not always, with a cheese or cream base). Soups with thinner bases are not generally served in bread bowls, as the broth would make the bread get too soggy too quickly. The bread becomes flavored as it absorbs some of the stew's base, and can be eaten after the stew has been eaten. Bread bowls are also used for dips, using the scooped-out bread for dipping.

Variations

A British firm has marketed naan bowls filled with chicken tikka masala. 

Spinach dip made with dehydrated vegetable soup mix is often served in a round pumpernickel bread loaf.

Coffin lid

"Coffin lid" or "coffin bread" is a Taiwanese variant developed in Tainan. It uses Texas toastpreferably those cut from the soft loaves popular in East Asiadeep frying the bread to a crisp. A layer of crust is then cut away to expose the inside, which is then dug out, allowing stews to be placed in. The crust layer is then replaced on top of the stew.

See also

References

External links
 

Breads
Serving and dining